The Essex Junto was a powerful group of New England Federalist Party lawyers, merchants, and politicians, so called because many in the original group were from Essex County, Massachusetts.

Origins and definition 
The term was coined as an invective by John Hancock in 1778 to describe the main opponents of a proposed constitution on Massachusetts. The proposed constitution was rejected by the people; the state adopted the Massachusetts Constitution in 1780. John Adams is also frequently credited with the use of the name.

Some politicians identified with the Essex Junto were Timothy Pickering, George Cabot, Fisher Ames, Francis Dana, Nathan Dane, Benjamin Goodhue, Stephen Higginson, Jonathan Jackson, John Lowell, Israel Thorndike, and Theophilus Parsons.

Early political activity 
The group supported Alexander Hamilton and a group of Massachusetts radicals led by Timothy Pickering that agitated for the dissolution of the Union or for New England's secession. When Hamilton was recruited to the plot to secede New England from the Union, he rejected the offer. Consequently, the Essex Junto tried to gain the support of Aaron Burr, who accepted the offer.

War of 1812 
During the War of 1812, the Junto was called "Blue Lights" because of the common belief and reports from the US Navy that they would shine blue lights to alert the British blockading ships of escaping American ships or to alert British ships to come ashore and carry out illegal trade. It supported the Hartford Convention's disaffection with the War of 1812, but the claim that it seriously proposed secession of New England is not considered historically accurate.

References

Brown, Charles The Northern Confederacy

External links
Essex Junto, article from Encyclopædia Britannica

History of Essex County, Massachusetts
Political history of Massachusetts
Political party factions in the United States
Federalist Party